Tiguipa is a genus of wasps belonging to the family Crabronidae.

The species of this genus are found in Southern America.

Species:
 Tiguipa argentina (Brèthes) 
 Tiguipa fiebrigi (Brèthes, 1909)

References

Crabronidae
Hymenoptera genera